Kedzie–Homan is an 'L' station on the CTA Blue Line's  branch. The station is located in the median of the Eisenhower Expressway and serving the East Garfield Park neighborhood and has two entrances on the Kedzie and Homan Avenue overpasses.

History
Kedzie–Homan was named Kedzie until the early 1990s, when the name was changed to Kedzie–Homan. However, signs on the platform still referred to the station as Kedzie until 2013, when signs with Kedzie-Homan were installed.

In 2000–2001, Kedzie–Homan was renovated with a number of improvements for $2.6 million. The improvements included making the station handicapped accessible by modifying the entrance ramps, brighter lighting, new doors, and a redesigned entryway to improve passenger flow.

Bus connections
CTA
 7 Harrison (Weekdays only)
 52 Kedzie
 82 Kimball-Homan

References

External links
 Kedzie–Homan Station Page
 Homan Avenue entrance from Google Maps Street View
 Kedzie Avenue entrance from Google Maps Street View

CTA Blue Line stations
Railway stations in the United States opened in 1958